In probability theory, conditional dependence is a relationship between two or more events that are dependent when a third event occurs.
 ( are independent).

But suppose that now  is observed to occur. We have

Conditional dependence of A and B given C is the logical negation of conditional independence . In conditional independence two events (which may be dependent or not) become independent given the occurrence of a third event.

Example 

In essence probability is influenced by a person's information about the possible occurrence of an event. For example, let the event  be 'I have a new phone'; event  be 'I have a new watch'; and event  be 'I am happy'; and suppose that having either a new phone or a new watch increases the probability of my being happy. Let us assume that the event  has occurred – meaning 'I am happy'. Now if another person sees my new watch, he/she will reason that my likelihood of being happy was increased by my new watch, so there is less need to attribute my happiness to a new phone.

and so

In this example,  occurs if and only if at least one of  occurs.

But conditional on  having occurred (the last three columns in the table), we have 

while 

See also

References 

Independence (probability theory)